Damon is an American television sitcom starring Damon Wayans that ran for thirteen episodes on Fox in 1998. The first three episodes aired Sunday at 8:30 pm and the rest aired Monday at 8:00 pm. 
It was created by Leo Benvenuti, Steve Rudnick and Damon Wayans and directed by John P. Whitesell.

Synopsis
Two brothers, one a bachelor and undercover detective, the other a married rent-a-cop, are reunited in Chicago. Things come easily to Damon, a clever but politically incorrect undercover cop. He has a quick wit, beautiful women and a challenging job. His older brother Bernard is a rent-a-cop home security officer who longs to be the real thing. Down on his luck and separated from his wife, he spends most of his time on Damon's couch. Down at the precinct, Captain Carol Czynencko is Damon's hard-as-nails boss who is trying to get in touch with her sensitive side; Stacy Phillips is a strong career-driven Latina who has a "no dating cops" rule; Carrol Fontain is a hypochondriac who makes his co-workers cringe with graphic descriptions of his problems; Jimmy Tortone is a Cuban con-artist who walks a fine line between shady and legit; and Billy McCarthy is a gung-ho, gullible new kid in the department who falls prey to everyone's practical jokes.

Cast
 Damon Wayans – Damon Thomas 
 David Alan Grier – Bernard Thomas 
 Andrea Martin – Captain Carol Czynencko
 Melissa De Sousa – Stacy Phillips
 Dom Irrera – Carrol Fontain
 Julio Oscar Mechoso – Jimmy Tortone
 Greg Pitts – Billy McCarthy
 Veronica Webb – Tracy Warren 
 Wil Albert – Mr. Himmelstein

Episodes

References

External links
Damon @ Carsey-Werner.net (en)
Carsey-Werner Damon
 

1998 American television series debuts
1998 American television series endings
1990s American black sitcoms
1990s American sitcoms
Fox Broadcasting Company original programming
Television shows set in Chicago
Television series by Carsey-Werner Productions